Louvignies-Bavay  is a former commune in the Nord department in northern France.  In 1946 it was merged into Bavay.

Heraldry

See also
Communes of the Nord department

Former communes of Nord (French department)